Grape Festival is an open-air summer music festival in Slovakia, first organized in 2010. The current venue is Trenčín Airport.

The festival features alternative music, rock, pop, dance music, world music, house, techno, drum and bass, hip hop.

History

2010
The first festival took place on 13 and 14 August 2010 at Piešťany Airport. Notable artist included Röyksopp, The Subways, Parov Stelar, Robots In Disguise. About 7,000 people attended the festival.

2011
In 2011, the festival took place from 12 to 13 August 2011 at Piešťany Airport. Notable artist included Interpol, Hurts, The Wombats, Marina & The Diamonds, The Qemists, The Sounds, N.O.H.A, Kormac´s Big Band. About 9,000 people attended the festival.

2012
On the 2012 festival, which took place from 10 to 11 August 2012, performed Example, Morcheeba, The Subways, Modestep, The Bloody Beetroots, Wolf Gang, Blood Red Shoes, New Ivory, The Twilight Sad,  and Tata Bojs. Almost 10,000 people attended that year.

2013
The festival took place on 9 and 10 August, featuring The Joy Formidable, The Drums, The Big Pink, Sunflower Caravan, Royal Republic, Puding pani Elvisovej, PSH, Para, Nero, Midi lidi, Luno, Korben Dallas, French Films, Freaks On Floor, Evelynne, Dub FX, Crystal Fighters, Bad Karma Boy, Strapo and other acts.

2014
The festival took place on 15 and 16 August, featuring Wilkinson, Vec, The Prostitutes, Skyline, Rangleklods, Papyllon, Palma Violets, Modré hory, Le Payaco, La Roux, Korben Dallas, Klaxons, Flux Pavilion, Fiordmoss, Editors, Bombay Bicycle Club, Billy Barman, and other acts.

2015
The festival took place on 14 and 15 August, featuring Triggerfinger, The Maccabees, The Drain, Tata Bojs, Selah Sue, Rebeka, Puding pani Elvisovej, Para, My Baby, MØ, Lenka Dusilová, Le Payaco, Kadebostany, José González, Intergalactic Lovers, Gramatik, Foals, Carnival Youth, Balthazar, Billy Barman and other acts. Around 10,000 people attended the festival.

2016
The festival took place on 12-13 August and featured !!!, Skyline, Scarecrow, Puding pani Elvisovej, Para, Oscar and the Wolf, Norma Jean Martine, Netsky, MØ, Milky Chance, Midi lidi, Medial Banana, Luno, Longital, Kaytranada, Jana Kirschner, Jake Bugg, Jan Blomqvist & Band, HVOB, Dub FX, Crystal Castles, Chiki liki tu-a, Camo & Krooked, Bokka, Bloc Party, Billy Barman, All Tvvins and other acts. Around 20,000 persons attended the festival.

2017
The festival took place on 11-12 August and featured Zola Jesus, Vladimir 518, Ventolin, Vec, Twelve (Yanko Kral x Inkwall), Tono S., The Temper Trap, The Naked and Famous, The Drain, Supa, Sub Focus, Seafret, Puding pani Elvisovej, Paulie Garand, Metrik, Medial Banana, Little Hurricane, Lenny, Korben Dallas, Kollektiv Turmstraße, Katarzia, Júníus Meyvant, Gleb, George FitzGerald, Dirtyphonics, De Staat, Cigarettes After Sex, Billy Barman, Bez ladu a skladu, B-Complex, Aurora, Two Door Cinema Club, Tom Odell, Moderat, Metronomy and other acts. Around 20,000 persons attended the event.

2018
The festival took place on 10–11 August and featured Yungblud, Yotto, Wolf Alice, Warhaus, Vypsaná fiXa, Ventolin, Tata Bojs, Skyline, Sevdaliza, Seasick Steve, San Holo, PSH, Para, Papyllon, Oh Wonder, Noisia, Nick Murphy fka Chet Faker, Modré hory, Modeselektor, Midi lidi, Medial Banana, MC Gey, Lamb, Jungle, Gleb, DZ Deathrays, Dirtyphonics, Chiki liki tu-a, Charlotte de Witte, Billy Barman, Bad Karma Boy, Astroid Boys, Antonia Vai, Wilkinson, Kodaline, Alt-J and other acts. Around 20,000 persons attended the event.

2019
The festival took place on 9-10 August and featured Yeasayer, Welshly Arms, Tom Grennan, The Black Madonna, Superorganism, Puding pani Elvisovej, Para, Medial Banana, Max Cooper, Kruder & Dorfmeister, Katarzia, Joyce Muniz, Jon Hopkins, IAMDDB, Dub FX, Daniel Avery, Black Honey, Billy Barman, Bad Karma Boy, APRE, Aphrodite, Andy C, Algiers, Adriatique, Tove Lo, The Vaccines, The Kooks, Rudimental, Chvrches and other acts. Around 20,000 persons attended the festival.

2020
The 2020 edition of the festival was meant to take place on 7 and 8 August but was cancelled due to COVID-19 restrictions.

See also

List of electronic music festivals

External links and references 
 Official website
Images:
 Grape 2010
 Grape 2011
 People moments
 Gregi Grape 2011
 Hudbask Grape 2011

Summer festivals
Electronic music festivals in Slovakia
Rock festivals in Slovakia
Summer events in Slovakia